Stephen Robert Macht (born May 1, 1942) is an American television and film actor. 

As the father of actor Gabriel Macht, he portrayed Henry Gerard, a Harvard professor in the US legal drama Suits, alongside his son.

Early life
Macht was born in Philadelphia, Pennsylvania, to Jewish parents Janette and Jerome Irving Macht . He was raised in Brooklyn Heights, New York until, at age nine, his father died and he moved with his mother and older brother, to live with his maternal grandfather, a haberdasher, in Mystic, Connecticut.

Career
Spotted by a Universal Studios talent scout while performing at the Stratford Shakespeare Festival in Canada in 1975, Macht was signed to a contract and by the mid-1970s had left teaching and was making frequent appearances in TV episodes and movies.

In Raid on Entebbe (1977), he portrayed Yoni Netanyahu, the Israeli officer killed in the rescue of hostages in Uganda. In 1978, he had a lead role in The Immigrants, a syndicated miniseries about the rise of the son of Italian immigrants in turn-of-the-century San Francisco.

After his appearance in the television movie American Dream (ABC, 1981) he was cast in a short-lived series which cast Macht in the role of a family man who chucks the suburban life to set up home in the inner city of Chicago. The following season, he landed the role of Joe Cooper, brother of Karen MacKenzie (Michele Lee), on Knots Landing (CBS, 1982–83). Other notable roles included playing Nancy McKeon's father in Strange Voices (NBC, 1987). He was Benedict Arnold in the miniseries George Washington (1984) and played one of the survivors of an air crash in Flight 90: Disaster on the Potomac (NBC, 1984). He spent three seasons (1985–88) as David Keeler, love interest to Cagney (Sharon Gless), on Cagney & Lacey (CBS). During his run on the show, he moved behind the cameras to make his directorial debut. In 1993, Macht played Krim Aldos in "The Siege", an early Season 2 episode of Star Trek: Deep Space Nine. Macht had been Gene Roddenberry's first choice to play Captain Jean-Luc Picard in Star Trek: The Next Generation, but the role eventually went to Patrick Stewart in 1986.

Later credits have included playing an Austrian Jew who must be baptized along with his wife and daughter in order to escape the Nazis in A Friendship in Vienna (1988 The Disney Channel); a doctor helping Jane Seymour in the syndicated miniseries Sidney Sheldon's Memories of Midnight (1991), and as cult member Joan Van Ark's suffering husband in Moment of Truth: A Mother's Deception (1994 NBC). Macht appeared in the 1995 third season Babylon 5 episode "A Day in the Strife"  as the character 'Na'Far'. Na'Far was the new official Narn representative, replacing G'Kar, after the Centauri's invasion of the Narn homeworld. In 1996 he did a six-month stint on the ABC daytime drama One Life to Live as Elliot Durban. From August 24, 2007 to February 13, 2009  he portrayed Trevor Lansing, attorney of organized crime boss Anthony Zacchara and father of attorney Ric Lansing, in the soap opera General Hospital for which Soap Opera Digest nominated him Best Villain of 2007. In 2014, 2015, 2016 and 2019, Macht guest starred opposite his son, actor Gabriel Macht, in Suits.

Macht's work in feature films has included The Choirboys (1977).  He also had roles in Nightwing (1979), The Mountain Men (1980), Galaxina (1980), The Last Winter (1984), The Monster Squad (1987), Stephen King's Graveyard Shift (1990), Amityville: It's About Time (1992), The Legend of Galgameth (1996), and Watchers Reborn (1998).  Macht has also played Dr. Harris in three installments of the Trancers series of films.

Personal life
Macht has been married to Suzanne Victoria Pulier, an archivist and museum curator  since 1964. They have four children: Julie, Ari Serbin, actor Gabriel and Jesse, a musician. Macht is also an ordained chaplain; and his book Moral Change: a Tragedy or a Return?: How Aristotle’s Tragic Reversal Illuminates Maimonides’ Teshuva was published on Amazon.com in October 2016.

Filmography

References

External links
 

1942 births
American male film actors
American male television actors
Male actors from Connecticut
Dartmouth College alumni
Indiana University alumni
Jewish American male actors
Living people
Male actors from New York (state)
Male actors from Philadelphia
Tufts University alumni
People from Mystic, Connecticut
People from Brooklyn Heights
21st-century American Jews
American expatriate male actors in Canada